Henry Guthrie (c. 1600 – 1676) was a 17th-century Scottish historian and cleric who rose to be Bishop of Dunkeld.

Life

The son of Elizabeth Small and the Perthshire minister Henry Guthrie, he was born around 1600 in Coupar Angus, a town in central Scotland, in the modern region of Perth and Kinross. He graduated from the University of St Andrews in 1621, studied theology and later served as a tutor and chaplain to the family of the Earl of Mar.

He became minister of Guthrie in 1624, and was promoted by King Charles I to the Church of the Holy Rude, Stirling in 1632. He took an ambiguous role in the Covenanter Wars and the Wars of the Three Kingdoms. He was deposed from his Stirling charge in 1648, although in 1656 was readmitted to the ministry, being given Kilspindie. Despite once opposing the re-establishment of episcopacy, abandoned since the National Covenant of 1638, he changed his position, and later after the episcopate of George Haliburton, became Bishop of Dunkeld, to which position he was consecrated on 24 August 1665. He held this position until his death in 1676.

Guthrie is best remembered for the account of his times he wrote and left to posterity, his Observations. Although circulating in his own day, they were not formally published until 1702.

Bibliography
Memoir by George Crawfurd prefixed to Memoirs; 
Hew Scott's Fasti Eccles. Scot.; 
Guthrie's Memoirs; 
Gordon's Scots Affairs (Spalding Club); 
Robert Baillie's Letters and Journals (Bannatyne Club); 
Nimmo's Hist. of Stirlingshire; 
Keith's Scottish Bishops.

References

Stevenson, David, "Guthrie , Henry (1600?–1676)", in the Oxford Dictionary of National Biography, Oxford University Press, 2004 , retrieved 20 Feb 2007

Further reading
Crawford, G. (ed.), The memoirs of Henry Guthry, late bishop, 2nd edn, (1748)

1600s births
1676 deaths
Alumni of the University of St Andrews
Bishops of Dunkeld (Church of Scotland)
People from Perth and Kinross
17th-century Scottish historians